This is a list of the people born in, residents of, or associated with the city of Fayetteville, Arkansas.

Television and movies
 Lisa Blount, actress and Oscar-winning producer
 Brent Bradshaw, writer and performer
 TJ Holmes, CNN anchor
 Jason Moore, director of 2004 Tony Award Best Musical Avenue Q
 Mary Kate Wiles, award-winning actress and producer
 Maddy Morphosis, Drag Queen one of the contestants of the fourteenth season of RuPaul's Drag Race.

Sports

Payton Willis (born 1998), basketball player in the Israeli Basketball Premier League

Authors and poets
 Fleda Brown, poet and author
 Richard Corben, comic book artist for Heavy Metal
 Ellen Gilchrist, novelist
 Donald Harington, author
 E. Lynn Harris, African-American gay author of ten consecutive The New York Times Best Seller list books
 Joan Hess, author of the Claire Malloy and Arly Hanks mystery series
 George Johnson, science writer and author
 Douglas C. Jones, historical fiction author
 John Rollin Ridge, first Native American novelist
 John Edward Williams, novelist and poet
 Miller Williams, poet

Musicians
 Cate Brothers, singer-songwriter musician duo
 Ronnie Hawkins, rockabilly musician
 Lucinda Williams, Grammy Award-winning songwriter and daughter of Miller Williams

Government
 Jim Bryson, member of the Tennessee Senate from District 23
 Bill Clinton, 42nd U.S. President and former Arkansas governor
 Hillary Clinton, former U.S. Secretary of State, First Lady, and U.S. Senator
 Lance Eads, Republican member of the Arkansas House of Representatives for Washington County since 2015; former resident
 J. William Fulbright, former U.S. Senator
 John W. Grabiel, Republican gubernatorial nominee in 1922 and 1924; Ohio native, attorney in Fayetteville until his death in 1928
 Lafayette Gregg, Associate Justice of the Arkansas Supreme Court from 1868 to 1874, Republican member of the Arkansas House of Representatives for Washington County from 1854 to 1856
 Grant Hodges, Republican member of the Arkansas House of Representatives for Benton County since 2015; former Fayetteville resident
 Jim House, Democratic member of the Arkansas House of Representatives
 Ben Hulse, member of the California State Senate, born and reared near Fayetteville
 Dustin McDaniel, former Attorney General of Arkansas
 David Pryor, former Arkansas governor and former U.S. senator
 Mark Pryor, former U.S. Senator

Other

 David A. Bednar, former professor at the University of Arkansas; member of the Quorum of the Twelve Apostles in the Church of Jesus Christ of Latter-day Saints
 George W. Bond, educator and former president of Louisiana Tech University
 Boogie2988, famous YouTuber and also 2016 Game Award winner voted as Trending Gamer of 2016
 Maurice Britt, decorated World War II veteran
 Sarah Caldwell, opera director, impresario, and stage director
 Admiral Vern E. Clark, chief of Naval Operation, US Navy
 Richard O. Covey, retired U.S. Air Force officer and former NASA astronaut
 J.R. Bob Dobbs, reclusive figurehead of the Church of the SubGenius
 E. Fay Jones, architect
 James Duard Marshall, artist
 John H. Pruitt, World War I soldier, one of only nineteen men to receive the Medal of Honor twice
 Savvy Shields, Miss America 2017
 Martin R. Steele, served 35 years in the Marine Corps, now president and CEO of the Intrepid Sea, Air & Space Museum in New York City
 Edward Durell Stone, architect
 Bud Walton, Wal-Mart co-founder
 Weev, computer hacker
 Donald Roller Wilson, artist

References

 
Fayetteville
Fayetteville